Wild Ireland is an Irish travel documentary series that began airing on 13 April 2015 on ITV. It was presented by Christine Bleakley.

The series was filmed throughout 2014 and had the working title of Wild Atlantic Way.

Awards
Wild Ireland won an IFTA Gala Television Award in the 'Factual' category in October 2015.

Episodes
Official viewing figures are from BARB.

References

2015 British television series debuts
2015 British television series endings
2015 Irish television series debuts
2015 Irish television series endings
2010s British documentary television series
ITV documentaries
English-language television shows
Television shows set in the Republic of Ireland